John Bradstreet (22 July 1652 – 11 January 1718) was an accused "witch" during the Salem Witch Trials.

Salem Witch Trials 
Bradstreet encountered some of the "afflicted girls" in the street, after which a dog barked at him and ran away.  The girls accused him of witchcraft, and Bradstreet immediately fled to New York.  He returned to Massachusetts after the hysteria died down.  The dog was hanged as a witch.

Family 
John Bradstreet was the son of Governor Simon Bradstreet and his wife Anne Dudley Bradstreet.  Anne's father was Thomas Dudley, another governor of Massachusetts Bay. He married Sarah Perkins of Topsfield (Province of Massachusetts) on 11 June 1677 and died in Topsfield, at the age of 65. John's brother, Dudley, was Justice of the Peace in Andover and another accused "witch". 

He and Sarah Perkins had these and other children:
 Simon, married Elizabeth Capen.
 Mercy, married John Hazen.
 Samuel, married first Sarah Clarke, second Elizabeth Champman.
Bradstreet is an ancestor of actor J. K. Simmons.

References 

1652 births
1718 deaths
People accused of witchcraft
People of the Salem witch trials